Clay Hendrix (born July 16, 1963) is an American football coach and former player. He is the head football coach at Furman University, a position he assumed in December 2016.

Head coaching record

References

External links
 Furman profile

1963 births
Living people
American football offensive linemen
Air Force Falcons football coaches
Furman Paladins football coaches
Furman Paladins football players
NC State Wolfpack football coaches
People from Commerce, Georgia
Coaches of American football from Georgia (U.S. state)
Players of American football from Georgia (U.S. state)